The Sundvollen Formation is a geologic formation cropping out along the northern and eastern shores of Steinsfjorden, Oslo Region, Norway. It preserves fossils dating back to the Gorstian to Ludfordian stages (Rootsiküla in the regional stratigraphy) of the Late Silurian period.

Description 
The formation belongs to the Ringerike Group, overlies the Steinsfjorden Formation and is overlain by the Stubdal Formation. The fish assemblage originates from a horizon with fine-grained, dark greyish-green sandstone from the lowermost part of the formation.

The formation comprises dark-grey siltstones associated with red sandstones and siltstones, with ripple marks, cross-laminations, and crack diapirs, and pseudo-nodules, carbonate concretions. The sequence is fining upwards in cyclothems. Tracks attributed to eurypterids have been found in the red siltstone. Turner (1974) interprets the Sundvollen Formation as representing meandering, braided streams on an alluvial, coastal plain, very close to sea level because of the minor marine incursions found). Boucot and Janis (1983) interpreted the environment to be possibly brackish-estuarine.

Fossil content 
The following fossils have been reported from the formation:

Fish 

 Loganellia cf. aldridgei
 Paralogania martinssoni
 Phlebolepis elegans
 Pterygolepis cf. nitida
 Rhyncholepis parvula
 Thelodus laevis
 Tyriaspis cf. whitei
 Osteostraci indet.

Eurypterids 

 Brachyopterella pentagonalis
 Eurypterus tetragonophthalmus
 Kiaeropterus ruedemanni
 Mixopterus kiaeri
 Nanahughmilleria norvegica
 Pterygotus (Erettopterus)
 Pterygotus holmi
 Stylonurella reudemanni
 Stylonuroides dolichopteroides
 Bunodes sp.
 Mixopterus sp.
 Nanahughmilleria sp.
 Pterygotus sp.

Invertebrates 
Gastropods
 Ateleaspis sp.

Crustaceans
 Dictyocaris slimoni
 Phyllocarida indet.

Ostracods
 Kiaeria limuloides

Xiphosura
 Xiphosurida indet.

Flora 
 Plantae indet.

Correlations 
The Sundvollen Formation correlates with the lower part of the Store Arøya Formation.

See also 
 List of fossiliferous stratigraphic units in Norway

References

Bibliography 
    Material was copied from this source, which is available under a Creative Commons Attribution 4.0 International License
 
 

Geologic formations of Norway
Silurian System of Europe
Silurian Norway
Gorstian
Ludfordian
Sandstone formations
Shale formations
Siltstone formations
Fluvial deposits
Silurian southern paleotemperate deposits
Paleontology in Norway
Formations